Guinea competed at the 1980 Summer Olympics in Moscow, USSR.  The nation returned to the Olympic Games after missing the 1972 and 1976 Games.

Results by event

Athletics
Men's 100 metres
 Paul Haba
 Heat — 11.19 (→ did not advance)

Men's 200 metres
 Paul Haba
 Heat — 22.70 (→ did not advance)

Men's 400 metres
 Mohamed Diakité
 Heat — 49.59 (→ did not advance)

Men's 800 metres
 Sekou Camara 
 Heat — 1:58.9 (→ did not advance)

Boxing
Men's Flyweight (51 kg)
 Aguibou Barry
 First Round — Lost to Hassen Sherif (Ethiopia) after disqualification in second round

Men's Bantamweight (54 kg)
 Samba Jacob Diallo
 First Round — Bye
 Second Round — Lost to Ganapathy Manoharan (India) on points (1-4)

Judo
Ibrahim Camara
Abdoulaye Diallo
Mamadou Diallo

References
Official Olympic Reports

Nations at the 1980 Summer Olympics
1980
Oly